Torkil Damhaug (born 1958) is a Norwegian physician and crime fiction writer.

Damhaug was born in Lillehammer. He made his literary debut in 1996 with Flykt, måne. His literary breakthrough was Døden ved vann from 2008. He was awarded the Riverton Prize for Ildmannen in 2011. Later books are the crime novel Sikre tegn på din død from 2013 and the thriller En femte årstid from 2016. En femte årstid is described as a psychological thriller, and was awarded the Riverton Prize for 2016.

References

1958 births
Living people
People from Lillehammer
Norwegian male novelists
Norwegian crime fiction writers
20th-century Norwegian physicians
20th-century Norwegian novelists
21st-century Norwegian novelists
20th-century Norwegian male writers
21st-century Norwegian male writers